Dzērbene Parish is an administrative unit of Cēsis Municipality in the Vidzeme region of Latvia. It is one of the 21 parishes in this municipality (Before the administrative reform of 2009, Dzērbene Parish was one of the 21 parishes in the former Cēsis District).

References

Parishes of Latvia
Cēsis Municipality
Vidzeme